Nicole Rautemberg (born 1 August 1999) is a Paraguayan swimmer. She competed in the women's 200 metre freestyle event at the 2017 World Aquatics Championships.

References

1999 births
Living people
Paraguayan female swimmers
Place of birth missing (living people)
Swimmers at the 2019 Pan American Games
Paraguayan female freestyle swimmers
Pan American Games competitors for Paraguay